Abdul Awal is a Bangladesh Awami League politician and the former Member of Parliament of Rangpur-9.

Career
Awal was elected to parliament from Rangpur-9 as a Bangladesh Awami League candidate in 1973.

References

Awami League politicians
Living people
1st Jatiya Sangsad members
People from Rangpur District
Year of birth missing (living people)